Osterling is a surname. Notable people with the surname include:

Anders Österling (1884–1981), Swedish poet and writer
Felipe Osterling (1932–2014), Peruvian lawyer, writer, and politician
Frederick J. Osterling (1865–1934), American architect